Brenna Chapel is a chapel of the Church of Norway in Porsanger Municipality in Troms og Finnmark county, Norway. It is located in the village of Brenna. It is an annex chapel for the Porsanger parish which is part of the Indre Finnmark prosti (deanery) in the Diocese of Nord-Hålogaland. The white, wooden church was built in a long church style in 1971 by the architect Edvard Bruvoll. The church seats about 55 people.

See also
List of churches in Nord-Hålogaland

References

Porsanger
Churches in Finnmark
Wooden churches in Norway
20th-century Church of Norway church buildings
Churches completed in 1971
1971 establishments in Norway
Long churches in Norway